The Order Paper is a daily publication in the Westminster system of government which lists the business of parliament for that day's sitting. A separate paper is issued daily for each house of the legislature.

The Order Paper provides members of the legislature with details of what will be happening in that house, including the questions that have been tabled for departmental question sessions and members who have been selected to speak. It also gives details of when and where the standing committees and select committees will be meeting, and the list of debates to be held. Written questions tabled to ministers by members of the legislature on the previous day are listed at the back of the order paper.

British parliamentarians often wave their Order Paper during debates in the House of Commons.

See also
 Meeting agenda

External links
Online publication of UK Order Paper
Order Paper BBC News

Political terminology
Academic works about politics
Westminster system